Sonya Agbessi is a Beninese long jumper. She competed at the 1992 Summer Olympics where she was also the flag bearer for Benin during the opening ceremony.

References 

Living people
Beninese long jumpers
Female long jumpers
Beninese female athletes
Olympic athletes of Benin
Athletes (track and field) at the 1992 Summer Olympics
Year of birth missing (living people)